Greatest Hits 1984–1987 is the debut LP release by American rock band Reggie and the Full Effect. The album was well received upon release and is considered a classic by fans.

History
This is the first album released by Reggie and the Full Effect. It was recorded in 1998 and released in 1999, and was the only Reggie and the Full Effect album to be released on Second Nature Recordings, with all subsequent albums (including this album's 2004 reissue) being released on Vagrant Records. The album was re-issued in 2004 to include several bonus tracks and demos. As of October 2022, the album is not available on major streaming services, with reasons being unspecified.

Track listing

Reissue bonus tracks
The album was re-released in 2004 by Vagrant Records and included 7 bonus previously unreleased tracks.

Personnel
James Dewees - drums, lead vocals, piano
Matt Pryor - guitar, backing vocals
Rob Pope - bass
Ed Rose - Production, Mixing

1999 debut albums
Reggie and the Full Effect albums
Albums produced by Ed Rose
Vagrant Records albums